Dracophyllum trimorphum, commonly known as inaka and dracophyllum, is a species of shrub or small tree endemic to north-west Nelson in New Zealand's South Island. It was first described by Walter Oliver in 1952 and gets the specific epithet trimorphum for its three phases of growth.

References

Citations 

trimorphum
Endemic flora of New Zealand